Manchego Ciudad Real Club de Fútbol was a Spanish football team based in Ciudad Real in the namesake province, in the autonomous community of Castile-La Mancha. Founded in 2000, it held home games at Estadio Rey Juan Carlos I, with a capacity of 2,900 seats.

History
After the disappearance of CD Manchego in 2000, Manchego CF was created. In July 2009, after six seasons in the fourth division, the club was in risk of being dissolved due to its outstanding debts, which reached €1.5 million. 

After Manchego CF supporters decided the club should continue, the president was forced to resign and, a day later, a new club, CD Ciudad Real was created. The Professional Spanish Footballers Association extended the deadline for some clubs to pay debts to their players past July 31. However, on August 25, the Royal Spanish Football Federation relegated the club in spite of it having finished in third position, due to the club's economic situation, but Manchego decided not to take part in the championship.

The team was succeeded by CD Ciudad Real.

Season to season

6 seasons in Tercera División

Honours
3 Campeonatos Diputación
1 Campeonato Regional de la Copa Federación

Famous players
 Iván Helguera
 Luis Helguera
 Paulino
 Raoul Loé

References

External links
Official website 
Futbolme team profile 

Football clubs in Castilla–La Mancha
Association football clubs established in 2000
2000 establishments in Spain
Sport in Ciudad Real
Association football clubs disestablished in 2009
2009 disestablishments in Spain